István Szatmári (born 23 May 1997) is a Hungarian football player. He plays for Gyirmót FC Győr.

Club career
He made his Nemzeti Bajnokság I debut for MTK Budapest on 31 May 2015 in a game against Diósgyőr.

Career statistics
.

References

External links
 

1997 births
Sportspeople from Miskolc
Living people
Hungarian footballers
Hungary youth international footballers
MTK Budapest FC players
Zalaegerszegi TE players
Békéscsaba 1912 Előre footballers
Gyirmót FC Győr players
Nemzeti Bajnokság I players
Association football midfielders